The Jiasian Petrified Fossil Museum is a museum in He'an Village, Jiasian District, Kaohsiung, Taiwan.

History
The museum was established in February 1991. It was built by Jiasian Township Government.

Architecture
The museum was built nearby fossil archaeological site within varied geological structure of the district.

See also
 List of museums in Taiwan

References

1991 establishments in Taiwan
Fossil museums
Museums established in 1991
Museums in Kaohsiung